Lensahn is an Amt ("collective municipality") in the district of Ostholstein, in Schleswig-Holstein, Germany. The seat of the Amt is in Lensahn.

The Amt Lensahn consists of the following municipalities:

Beschendorf 
Damlos 
Harmsdorf 
Kabelhorst 
Lensahn
Manhagen 
Riepsdorf

Ämter in Schleswig-Holstein